Seiko Kawamura (河村 聖子 Kawamura Seiko, born 23 May 1984) is a Japanese volleyball player who plays for Toyota Auto Body Queenseis.

Profile
Her mother, Keiko Okushima, was on the national volleyball team.
She became a volleyball player at 6 years old.
While attending high school, the volleyball team won in the Japanese high school league with Megumi Kurihara and Rie Takaki.

Clubs
MitajiriJoshi High School → JT Marvelous (2003–2009) → Toyota Auto Body Queenseis（2009-）

National team
 2008 - 1st AVC Women's Cup

References

External links
JVA Biography
Queenseis Official Website

Japanese women's volleyball players
Living people
1984 births